Volodymyr Hrynyov, also Hryniov is a Ukrainian politician, former candidate to the President of Ukraine.

Biography
Hrynov was born on July 26, 1945 in Bolshaya Troitsa village of Kursk Oblast (now Belgorod Oblast, Russia). In 1968 he graduated with honors from the Kharkiv Polytechnical Institute. In 1972 he defended his candidate dissertation (PhD), and in 1981, his doctoral dissertation.

On March 30, 1990 he participated in Verkhovna Rada elections in electoral district no. 170 in Kharkiv. In the first round, none of the five candidates obtained the required 50% of votes; in the second round he obtained 53.49% votes and was elected to the parliament. In Verkhovna Rada, Hrynov was elected Vice-Chairmen, in which position he served until his voluntary resignation in June 1993.

On December 1, 1991, Hrynov participated in the first presidential elections in Ukraine. He was supported by 1,329,758 voters (4.17%), and took fourth place out of six candidates. In 1993 he became the president of International Fund "Business Diaspora of Ukraine". In the same year he organized the Party "Interregional Block of Reforms", of which he was the leader until May 1999.

On March 27, 1994, Hrynov participated in the parliamentary elections in the same electoral district in Kharkiv. He obtained less than 50% of votes in the first round. In the second round his opponent withdrew from elections, and Hrynov obtained 75.64%. Because Hrynov was the only candidate, and the elections required alternatives, Hrynov was not recognized as being elected to the parliament.

Hrynov attempted to run for the President of Ukraine position in the ahead-of-schedule presidential elections of 1994, but he withdrew in favor of Leonid Kuchma, who was elected president. Hrynov was appointed as an advisor to the President.

In 1998 Hrynov participated in the parliamentary elections as one of the leaders of SLON, but his block obtained less than one percent of votes and no seats in the parliament.

Over his political career, Hrynov had been criticized by opponents for being a liberal, a pro-Russian politician, a supporter of the federate system of Ukraine, and for changing political preferences too often. In 2002, Hrynov supported Yushchenko, and his Our Ukraine block, but was not a member of the block himself. In the 2000s, Hrynov was the vice-president of the Interregional Academy of Personnel Management (MAUP).

Hrynov is married, has a son and daughter. He speaks English and German. He is a sport master in judo, and sambo.

External links
Stolichnye Novosti, interview with Hrynov, February 2002

1945 births
Living people
People from Shebekinsky District
Communist Party of the Soviet Union members
Party of Democratic Revival of Ukraine politicians
Russian emigrants to Ukraine
Candidates in the 1991 Ukrainian presidential election
First convocation members of the Verkhovna Rada
Kharkiv Polytechnic Institute alumni
Deputy chairmen of the Verkhovna Rada